CarPrice Limited is an online used car broker and auctioneer headquartered in Moscow, Russia, with more than 50 offices in 23  large Russian cities. The company was founded in 2014 by Eduard Gurinovich and Oskar Hartmann.  In October 2016 Denis Dolmatov became CEO of the company.

In 2015 CarPrice was mentioned as one of the "hottest European startups" by Wired UK. In February 2016 the company opened an office in Japan.

Investments 
 CarPrice has closed three investment rounds and received $46 million. According to public information on the company's website and mass media, funding rounds were closed by Russian and European venture funds, such as Baring Vostok Capital Partners, E.ventures, Almaz Capital and others. According to media reports, this deal was the largest investment in the Russian technology start-up since the beginning of economical and financial crisis in 2014. CarPrice was named "Deal of the Year" by Venture Awards Russia 2015.

In June 2017 Mitsui acquired a 25% stake in CarPrice's Japanese office.

References

External links 
 Official website (in Russian)

Auto dealerships
Russian companies established in 2014
Companies based in Moscow
Used car market